Madinda Ndlovu (born 2 May 1965) is a Zimbabwean former footballer and manager currently in charge of Botswana Premier League club Gaborone United. He is generally considered one of the greatest Zimbabwean players of all time.

After retiring Ndlovu began his managerial career as head coach of his boyhood club Highlanders in 1998. He first came to Botswana as the manager of Township Rollers in 2005 but lasted only two seasons before joining fellow Botswana Premier League club Nico United, helping them to a highest-ever league finish.

Honours

Manager
Highlanders, 2019
Mochudi Centre Chiefs
Botswana Premier League:2
2011-12, 2012-13
Township Rollers
Botswana Premier League:1
2013-14
Orapa United
Mascom Top 8 Cup: 1 
2015-16

References

1965 births
Living people
Zimbabwean football managers